Thomas St. Angelo (January 13, 1889 – June 16, 1967) was a member of the Wisconsin State Assembly.

Biography
St. Angelo was born on January 13, 1889, in Cumberland, Wisconsin. He attended La Salle Extension University. From 1945 to 1951 and again in 1958, St. Angelo chaired the Barron County, Wisconsin chapter of the International Red Cross and Red Crescent Movement. He died on June 16, 1967, at Cumberland Memorial Hospital, following a heart attack.

Career
St. Angelo was elected to the Assembly and re-elected in 1962. Previously, he had been an unsuccessful candidate for the Assembly in 1958. He was a Republican.
The library in Cumberland, Wisconsin, is named in his honor.

References

People from Cumberland, Wisconsin
Republican Party members of the Wisconsin State Assembly
La Salle Extension University alumni
1889 births
1967 deaths
20th-century American politicians